Missouri Mines State Historic Site occupies Federal Mill No. 3 in Park Hills, Missouri, United States, which processed the lead and zinc ore that was mined in the immediate area for many decades. The site's old power building features a geological and mining history museum and interpretive center focusing on the state's historic Old Lead Belt.

The plant was built by the Federal Lead Co. in 1906-1907 and subsequently bought by competitor St. Joseph Lead Company in 1923. The mill was retired in 1972 as much of the ore in the area had been mined and major operations were moving west. In 1975, the land was donated to the state of Missouri for recreational use. Much of the land was considered too damaged for return to a natural state and so became set aside for off-roading vehicles as St. Joe State Park, while the mill site was designated an interpretive center.

See also
Mining in the United States
Desloge Consolidated Lead Company

References

External links 

Missouri Mines State Historic Site Missouri Department of Natural Resources
Missouri Mines State Historic Site Map Missouri Department of Natural Resources

Missouri State Historic Sites
Protected areas established in 1976
Museums in St. Francois County, Missouri
Geology museums in the United States
Industry museums in Missouri
Mines in Missouri
Mining museums in Missouri
Protected areas of St. Francois County, Missouri
Lead mines in the United States